Christopher Konopka (born April 14, 1985) is an American professional soccer player who plays as a goalkeeper.

Konopka played for Toronto FC in Major League Soccer from 2013 to 2015 bringing the team to their first ever playoff appearance in club history in 2015. During 2015 he set TFC records for most regular single-season game wins (11) and highest regular single-season win percentage (59.5%) by any Toronto FC goalkeeper in the club's tenure.

During 2016 Konopka signed with Ross County in the Scottish Premiership until the end of the 2015–2016 season. He won the 2015–16 Scottish League Cup on March 16, 2016 while at Ross County. In July 2016, he joined the Portland Timbers of Major League Soccer until the end of 2016.

In 2017, he played for FC Edmonton in the North American Soccer League.

In 2018, Konopka signed a deal with EFL Championship side Cardiff City until the end of the 2017–18 season. In October 2018 he joined Minnesota United on a short-term deal as an emergency goalkeeper for the remainder of the MLS season.

Konopka is the first American born soccer player to ever win the Irish Double and also the first to win back-to-back FAI Cup medals.

Personal life 
Konopka grew up in Toms River, New Jersey and played both basketball and soccer at Toms River High School East. He holds both American and Polish citizenship. He is married to Maria Papadakis.

Amateur and college 
Konopka came through the youth system of the Jersey Shore Boca soccer club in South Jersey. In the summer of 2003 he played for the club's Premier Development League team. In the summer of 2004 he made 8 appearances for the Jersey Falcons in the same league.

Providence College 
He played NCAA Division I collegiate soccer in the Big East Conference at Providence College from 2003 to 2006. Konopka earned himself trials in England after his senior season with Charlton Athletic, Cardiff City, and Walsall FC. However, he was unable to sign in the United Kingdom as his attempted acquisition of a Polish passport through ancestry had not yet been completed.

Club career

Kansas City Wizards 
Konopka was drafted in the third round, 29th overall, by the Kansas City Wizards in 2007 MLS Supplemental Draft. He became the first player in the history of Providence College to be drafted by an MLS team. Konopka was released by the Wizards at the end of the 2007 season without making an appearance.

In December 2007, Konopka was named to the United States U-23 National Team player pool by head coach Piotr Nowak.

Bohemians 
In March 2008 Konopka signed a one-year contract with Bohemian FC following a successful trial. He made his debut on July 1, 2008 against Derry City in the League Cup.

As a member of Bohs, Konopka won the League of Ireland championship and the FAI Cup in 2008. He also impressed with the Bohemians' A-Side in the inaugural A Championship, leading Bohemians to the Grand Final.

Sporting Fingal 
On July 28, 2009 Konopka signed a short-term contract with then League of Ireland First Division side Sporting Fingal.

He made his debut on October 2, 2009 in a 2–2 draw against Monaghan United. Konopka went on to make 3 more appearances for Fingal including a 4–2 win over Bray Wanderers in the 2009 FAI Cup semi-final on October 25. Konopka helped the club win the 2009 FAI Cup and promotion to the League of Ireland Premier Division for 2010.

Waterford United 
Konopka signed with Waterford United on December 18, 2009 for the 2010 season. He made his debut on March 5, 2010 in a 3–0 victory over Wexford Youths.

Konopka received "man of the match" honours from extratime.ie for his performance in a 1–0 victory over Shelbourne on May 7, 2010. It was Waterford's first win over Shelbourne at Tolka Park in 11 years.

Columbus Crew 
Konopka was signed by the Columbus Crew of Major League Soccer from the MLS Goalkeeper Pool on July 26, 2011. Despite featuring in an international friendly that evening against Newcastle United and being re-called for 4 future matches he would not make a professional appearance for the club.

New York Red Bulls 
Konopka was signed by New York Red Bulls from the MLS Goalkeeper Pool on August 13, 2011. He made his league debut that evening in a 2–2 draw against the Chicago Fire. His emergency loan ended after the match and he returned to the MLS Goalkeeper Pool.

Philadelphia Union 
On March 2, 2012, Konopka signed with the Philadelphia Union.

He made his debut on May 26, 2012, in a 1–0 loss against Toronto FC. Three days later he featured in Philadelphia's first US Open Cup victory against the Rochester Rhinos.

Toronto FC 
On September 13, 2013, the Philadelphia Union traded Konopka to Toronto FC .

Konopka made his debut on May 2, 2015 in a 1–0 victory against his former club the Philadelphia Union.

He was named to the MLS Team of the Week on May 18, 2015 for his seven save effort in a 1–1 draw against the New England Revolution.

Konopka finished 2015 with a break-out season for TFC setting the all-time single season Toronto goalkeeper league win record with 11 and his 59.5 win percentage is the best ever in Toronto goalkeeping history.

Ross County 
On March 8, 2016, Konopka joined Ross County in the Scottish Premiership until the end of the 2015–16 season. On March 13, 2016, Konopka was a substitute for Ross County who won the 2015–16 Scottish League Cup 2–1 against Hibernian.

Portland Timbers 
Konopka returned to Major League Soccer and signed for the Timbers on July 28, 2016.

FC Edmonton 
On February 15, 2017, Konopka signed with North American Soccer League side FC Edmonton.

Cardiff City 
On March 8, 2018, Konopka signed a short-term deal with EFL Championship side Cardiff City until the end of the 2017–18 season as cover for Neil Etheridge and Brian Murphy.

Minnesota United
Konopka joined Minnesota United on a short-term deal as emergency goalkeeper cover. He appeared as an unused substitute in Minnesota's match against Columbus Crew on October 28, 2018.

Tampa Bay Rowdies
Konopka was signed by the USL Championship's Tampa Bay Rowdies on February 27, 2019.

Career statistics

Honors

Club 

Bohemians
 League of Ireland Champions: 2008
 FAI Cup Winners: 2008

Sporting Fingal
 FAI Cup Winners: 2009

Waterford United
 Munster Senior Cup Winners: 2010

Ross County
Scottish League Cup: 2015–16

References

External links

Chris Konopka – Providence College Profile
 

1985 births
Living people
American soccer players
American expatriate soccer players
Soccer players from New Jersey
American people of Polish descent
Sporting Kansas City players
Sportspeople from Toms River, New Jersey
Toms River High School East alumni
Providence Friars men's soccer players
Bohemian F.C. players
Sporting Fingal F.C. players
Waterford F.C. players
New York Red Bulls players
Philadelphia Union players
Toronto FC players
Toronto FC II players
League of Ireland players
Association football goalkeepers
Jersey Falcons players
Expatriate association footballers in the Republic of Ireland
Expatriate soccer players in Canada
USL League Two players
Major League Soccer players
USL Championship players
Sporting Kansas City draft picks
Ross County F.C. players
Portland Timbers players
Cardiff City F.C. players
A Championship players
FC Edmonton players
Minnesota United FC players
Tampa Bay Rowdies players
UCF Knights men's soccer coaches